The 1989 Calder Cup playoffs of the American Hockey League began on April 4, 1989. The eight teams that qualified, four from each division, played best-of-seven series for Division Semifinals and Division Finals. The division champions played a best-of-seven series for the Calder Cup.  The Calder Cup Final ended on May 16, 1989, with the Adirondack Red Wings defeating the New Haven Nighthawks four games to one to win the Calder Cup for the third time in team history. Adirondack's Sam St. Laurent won the Jack A. Butterfield Trophy as AHL playoff MVP.

Playoff seeds
After the 1988–89 AHL regular season, the top four teams from each division qualified for the playoffs. The Sherbrooke Canadiens finished the regular season with the best overall record.

Northern Division
Sherbrooke Canadiens - 103 points
Halifax Citadels - 92 points
Moncton Hawks - 83 points
New Haven Nighthawks - 80 points

Southern Division
Adirondack Red Wings - 100 points
Hershey Bears - 90 points
Utica Devils - 83 points
Newmarket Saints - 82 points

Bracket

In each round, the team that earned more points during the regular season receives home ice advantage, meaning they receive the "extra" game on home-ice if the series reaches the maximum number of games. There is no set series format due to arena scheduling conflicts and travel considerations.

Division Semifinals 
Note: Home team is listed first.

Northern Division

(1) Sherbrooke Canadiens vs. (4) New Haven Nighthawks

(2) Halifax Citadels vs. (3) Moncton Hawks

Southern Division

(1) Adirondack Red Wings vs. (4) Newmarket Saints

(2) Hershey Bears vs. (3) Utica Devils

Division Finals

Northern Division

(3) Moncton Hawks vs. (4) New Haven Nighthawks

Southern Division

(1) Adirondack Red Wings vs. (2) Hershey Bears

Calder Cup Final

(S1) Adirondack Red Wings vs. (N4) New Haven Nighthawks

See also
1988–89 AHL season
List of AHL seasons

References

Calder Cup
Calder Cup playoffs